Sibbaldbie is a small village in Annandale, Dumfries and Galloway, Scotland.

References

Villages in Dumfries and Galloway